Fusiturris similis is a species of sea snail, a marine gastropod mollusk in the family Fusiturridae.

It has also been found as a fossil from the Pleistocene in Sicily.

Description
The size of an adult shell varies between 30 mm and 55 mm.

Distribution
This species occurs in European waters, the Mediterranean Sea, the Atlantic Ocean off the Canaries, Cape Verde, West Africa and the equatorial zone.

References

Bibliography

 Bernard, P.A. (Ed.) (1984). Coquillages du Gabon [Shells of Gabon]. Pierre A. Bernard: Libreville, Gabon. 140, 75 plates pp.
 Gofas, S.; Le Renard, J.; Bouchet, P. (2001). Mollusca, in: Costello, M.J. et al. (Ed.) (2001). European register of marine species: a check-list of the marine species in Europe and a bibliography of guides to their identification. Collection Patrimoines Naturels, 50: pp. 180–213 
 Rolán E., 2005. Malacological Fauna From The Cape Verde Archipelago. Part 1, Polyplacophora and Gastropoda.

External links
 
 Specimen of Fusiturris similis at MNHN, Paris

similis
Gastropods described in 1838
Molluscs of the Atlantic Ocean
Molluscs of the Mediterranean Sea
Molluscs of the Canary Islands
Gastropods of Cape Verde